Live Hot Potatoes! is the first live concert album released by Australian children's music group, the Wiggles. It was released in 2005 in Australia by ABC Music, distributed by Roadshow Entertainment. It won the ARIA Music Award for Best Children's Album.

Track list
 Overture
 Toot Toot, Chugga Chugga, Big Red Car
 Introduction
 Rock-a-Bye Your Bear
 Let's Wake Jeff Up! (spoken)
 Jeff's Favourite Instrument (spoken)
 Let's Wake Jeff Up Again! (spoken)
 Introduction
 Lights, Camera, Action, Wiggles!
 Introduction
 Hoop-Dee-Doo
 Introduction
 D.O.R.O.T.H.Y. (My Favourite Dinosaur)
 Introduction
 Rolling Down the Sandhills/Running Up the Sandhills
 Introduction
 Can You (Point Your Fingers and Do the Twist?)
 Introduction
 Butterflies Flit
 Network Wiggles News (spoken)
 Where's Jeff?
 Music With Murray (introduction)
 Play Your Guitar with Murray
 The Monkey Dance
 Introduction
 We're Dancing with Wags the Dog
 Central Park New York
 Introduction
 Here Come The Reindeer
 Introduction
 Fruit Salad
 Introduction
 Captain Feathersword Fell Asleep on His Pirate Ship (Quack Quack)
 Eagle Rock
 Introduction
 I Wave My Arms and Swing My Baton
 Hot Potato
 Christmas Medley
 Farewell

Video

Live Hot Potatoes! is the third live in concert video. It was filmed during their show on 20 December 2003 in Sydney on the Lights Camera Action Wiggles Tour and was released in 2005.

Cast
The Wiggles are:
 Murray Cook
 Jeff Fatt
 Anthony Field
 Greg Page

Also featuring
 Paul Paddick as Captain Feathersword

References

External links

2005 albums
ARIA Award-winning albums
The Wiggles albums
The Wiggles videos
2005 video albums
Australian children's musical films